William Dinwiddie (August 23, 1867 – June 17, 1934) was an American journalist, war photographer, writer and colonial administrator in the Philippines. He was born in Charlottesville, Virginia.

Early life
Dinwiddie took some courses at Columbia University (1881–1883); and then he worked as a customs inspector in Corpus Christi, Texas (1883–1886).  He worked for the Bureau of American Ethnology (1886–1895); and then he decided to change careers, becoming a foreign correspondent and photographer.

War correspondent

Dinwiddie was a journalist and a war photographer for Harper's Weekly during the Spanish–American War, assigned to report and photograph the American campaigns in Cuba and Puerto Rico.

He was a war correspondent for the New York Herald during the Russo-Japanese War (1904–1905).

Personal life
William Dinwiddie was twice married.  In 1891 he married Mary E Towers, daughter of Chatham Moore Towers and Sallie Lewis Nuckolls.  They were the parents of two children: Dorothy and Redfield Towers Dinwiddie.  In 1901 he married Caroline Miller Brooke, daughter of William S Brooke and Mary Shoemaker Hallowell.

Selected works 
 War Sketches in Truth
 Our New Possessions
 The War in the Philippines
 The War in South Africa
 Puerto Rico: Its Conditions & Possibilities

Notes

References 
 Haverstock, Nathan A. (1996).  Fifty Years at the Front: The Life of War Correspondent Frederick Palmer. Washington, D.C.: Brassey's.  ;  OCLC 33041795
 Leonard, John William and Albert Nelson Marquis. (1899).  Who's who in America. Chicago: A. N. Marquis.  OCLC 35908327
 Roth, Mitchel P. and James Stuart Olson. (1997).  Historical Dictionary of War Journalism. Westport, Connecticut: Greenwood Publishing Group.  
 The Charleston Gazette.  Jun 18, 1934.  Charleston, West Virginia.  Page 2, column 3.  "William Dinwiddie, Newspaperman, Dies"

1867 births
1934 deaths
American war photographers
War correspondents of the Russo-Japanese War
19th-century American journalists
19th-century American male writers
19th-century American photographers
20th-century American journalists
American male journalists
20th-century American male writers
20th-century American photographers
New York Herald people
United States Customs Service personnel
Columbia University alumni
People from Charlottesville, Virginia
Journalists from Virginia
Photographers from Virginia